The 2006 Cheltenham & Gloucester Trophy was an English county cricket tournament, held between 23 April and 26 August 2006. The tournament was won by Sussex, who defeated Lancashire in the final at Lord's Cricket Ground.

Group stage

North Division

South Conference

Final

References

External links
2006 Cheltenham & Gloucester Trophy  at CricketArchive.

Friends Provident Trophy seasons
Cheltenham andAmp Gloucester Trophy, 2006